Pascal Ory (born 31 July 1948) is a French historian.  A student of René Rémond, he specialises in cultural and political history and has written on Fascism ever since his master's dissertation on the Greenshirts of Henri Dorgères.  In the 1970s, he contributed to a better definition of cultural history.

Ory is a professor at the Université de Paris-I-Panthéon-Sorbonne.  He is president of the Association pour le développement de l'histoire culturelle (ADHC) and regent of the Collège de 'Pataphysique.

Involved in politics, he was a municipal councillor, formerly an ally to the mayor Georges Lemoine, and head of the socialist list in the municipal elections of March 2001, in the city of Chartres.

Ory was elected to the Académie Française on 4 March 2021.

Works 
Les Collaborateurs 1940–1945, Le Seuil, 1976, 331 p. nouv. éd., coll. « Points »-histoire 1980
La France allemande, Gallimard, "archives", 1977
 Nizan – Destin d'un révolté, 1980Le Petit Nazi illustré. Vie et mort du "Téméraire" (1943–1944), Paris, éditions Albatros, collections Histoires/Imaginaires, 1979, 122 p. rééd. revue et augmentée, Paris, Nautilus, 2002. Preface by Léon Poliakov – on a Nazi propaganda review for childrenL'Anarchisme de droite ou du mépris considéré comme une morale, le tout assorti de réflexions plus générales, Grasset, Paris, 1985, 288p.  – an openly polemical work "dedicated to the anarchists of the left"Une nation pour mémoire. 1889, 1939, 1989 trois jubilés révolutionnaires, Paris, PFNSP, 1992, 282p.
Direction, préface et conclusions de : La Censure en France à l'ère démocratique (1848–...), Complexe, coll. « Histoire culturelle », 1997, 358 p.L'Europe ? L'Europe... (anthologie commentée), Omnibus, 1998, 900 p.Le Discours gastronomique français des origines à nos jours, Gallimard, collection "Archives", 1998, 203 p.Les Intellectuels en France de l'Affaire Dreyfus à nos jours, in collaboration with Jean-François Sirinelli, réédition Armand Colin, 1999, 264 p.Les Intellectuels en France, de l’Affaire Dreyfus à nos jours, republished and expanded, Paris, Armand Colin, 2002.Du fascisme, Paris, Perrin, 2003, 293 p.L'Histoire culturelle, Paris, Presses universitaires de France, 2004, 128 p.Goscinny (1926–1977) : La liberté d'en rire, Paris, Perrin, 2007.
 L'invention du bronzage – Essai d'une histoire culturelle :  Complexe (Editions), June 2008, 135 p.La culture comme aventure. Treize exercices d'histoire culturelle, Complexe, 2008

Honours
Commandeurs of the Ordre des Arts et des Lettres: 2012
Chevaliers of the Ordre national du Mérite
Chevalier de la Légion d’Honneur

References

External links

Personal page at Pantheon-Sorbonne Université Paris 1

Online articles
"L'Histoire culturelle de la France contemporaine : question et questionnement", Vingtième Siècle. Revue d'histoire'', vol. 16 (1987), pp 67–82
"La nature de la culture", nonfiction.fr, 2008, critique by Christophe Prochasson
"Lectures de plage : à propos de deux histoires du bronzage", nonfiction.fr, 2008, critique by Antoine Roullet

Online conference
 Américanisation:le mot,la chose,le spectre, Centre d'études et de recherches internationales de l'Université de Montréal, 22 February 2007.(video available)

Living people
1948 births
People from Fougères
Academic staff of the University of Paris
20th-century French historians
Historians of anarchism
Comics critics
Commandeurs of the Ordre des Arts et des Lettres
Knights of the Ordre national du Mérite
Members of the Académie Française
Chevaliers of the Légion d'honneur
French male non-fiction writers
21st-century French historians